Bunker Oil AS is a Norwegian downstream petroleum company that operates four major and sixteen smaller oil tank facilities as well as 20 fuel stations. The main tank facilities are located in Hessa, Tromsø, Hammerfest and Båtsfjord. It also operates bunker oil services in Trondheim Port and Ålesund Port.

In 1992, the company bought the tank facilities of Mobil north of Stadt. The main customer is Esso.

Automotive fuel retailers
Companies based in Møre og Romsdal
Oil companies of Norway